Neslihan Kılıç (born 2 May 1993) is a Turkish badminton player.

Achievements

BWF International Challenge/Series 
Women's singles

Women's doubles

Mixed doubles

  BWF International Challenge tournament
  BWF International Series tournament
  BWF Future Series tournament

References

External links 
 

Living people
1993 births
Turkish female badminton players